The 1961–62 DFB-Pokal was the 19th season of the annual German football cup competition. It began on 28 July 1962 and ended on 29 August 1962. 16 teams competed in the tournament of four rounds. In the final 1. FC Nürnberg defeated Fortuna Düsseldorf 2–1 after extra time.

Matches

Round of 16

Quarter-finals

Replay

Semi-finals

Final

References

External links
 Official site of the DFB 
 Kicker.de 
 1962 results at Fussballdaten.de 
 1962 results at Weltfussball.de 

1961-62
1961–62 in German football cups